The Ziegler House, also known as Ziegler Residence, in Syracuse, New York was designed by architect Ward Wellington Ward and built in 1915.  Along with other Ward Wellington Ward-designed homes, it was listed on the National Register of Historic Places in 1997.  It is a -story house.  The property includes a garage also designed by Ward, which included a turntable so that vehicles would not have to be backed out of the driveway.  The turntable is not functional.

The property was listed for its architecture.  The living room includes a Mercer tile fireplace.

As of the 1997 listing, the kitchen was one of very few original kitchens in a Ward-designed home.

References

Houses in Syracuse, New York
National Register of Historic Places in Syracuse, New York
Houses on the National Register of Historic Places in New York (state)
Bungalow architecture in New York (state)
American Craftsman architecture in New York (state)
Houses completed in 1915